Nagoya Line may refer to either of the following railway lines in Tōkai region, Japan:
 Nagoya Line (Kintetsu), a railway line owned and operated by the Kintetsu Railway, connecting Matsusaka and Nagoya
 Meitetsu Nagoya Main Line, a railway line owned and operated by the Nagoya Railroad, connecting Toyohashi and Gifu via Nagoya